Alidade Creek is a stream in the U.S. state of Idaho. It is a tributary of Johnson Creek.

Alidade Creek was named after the alidade, a surveying instrument.

References

Rivers of Elmore County, Idaho
Rivers of Idaho